Christian Dick (2 September 1883 – 14 August 1955) was a Norwegian sailor who competed in the 1920 Summer Olympics. He was a crew member of the Norwegian boat Fornebo, which won the silver medal in the 7 metre class.

References

External links 
 
 

1883 births
1955 deaths
Norwegian male sailors (sport)
Sailors at the 1920 Summer Olympics – 7 Metre
Olympic sailors of Norway
Olympic silver medalists for Norway
Olympic medalists in sailing
Medalists at the 1920 Summer Olympics